Sociedad Deportiva Buelna is a football team based in Los Corrales de Buelna in the autonomous community of Cantabria. Founded in 1948, the team plays in Regional Preferente. The club's home ground is Estadio Municipal, which has a capacity of 5,500 spectators.

Season to season

9 seasons in Tercera División

External links
Official website 
Futbolme.com profile 

Football clubs in Cantabria
Association football clubs established in 1948
Divisiones Regionales de Fútbol clubs
1948 establishments in Spain